The 2016 Sugar Bowl is a bowl game that was played on January 1, 2016 at the Mercedes-Benz Superdome in New Orleans, Louisiana. This 82nd Sugar Bowl was played between the University of Mississippi and Oklahoma State University.  It is one of the 2015–16 bowl games that concluded the 2015 FBS football season.  Sponsored by the Allstate insurance company, the game is officially known as the Allstate Sugar Bowl.

The contest was televised on ESPN and ESPN Deportes, with a radio broadcast on ESPN Radio and XM Satellite Radio. Kickoff time was set for 8:30 PM EST.

In the game, Ole Miss won by a score of 48–20 to get their first 10–win season since 2003, and only their second since the Vaught era. Both teams finished their respective seasons with 10–3 records.

Teams
This was Oklahoma State's first Sugar Bowl since 1946, and Ole Miss's first since 1970. It was the third meeting between the two schools, having contested the Cotton Bowl Classic in 2004 and 2010. Ole Miss won all three games.

Oklahoma State

Oklahoma State began the season winning their first 10 games, which included a win over then–no. 5 TCU. Following the 10–0 start, the Cowboys had a #4 ranking in the College Football Playoff poll and controlled its own destiny in the Big 12. However, the Cowboys' undefeated season came to end when then–no. 10 Baylor beat them in Stillwater. The Cowboys would then lose another game at home in blowout fashion to rival and eventual Big 12 champion and College Football Playoff participant, Oklahoma. The Cowboys then fell to #16 in the CFP poll entering the Sugar Bowl, their first New Year's Six bowl game.

Ole Miss

Ole Miss began the season by handily defeating their first two opponents, scoring at least 73 points in each of the first two games before playing the then–second ranked Alabama on the road. In an upset, the Rebels beat the Crimson Tide and rose to #3 in the AP Poll. Just two weeks later, however, the Rebels would be blown out by then–no. 25 Florida. Following an easy win over New Mexico State, the Rebels traveled to Memphis, who they lost to in an upset. Ole Miss won their next two games against then–no. 15 Texas A&M and Auburn and performed well in the SEC West before suffering a defeat to Arkansas. Ole Miss ended the regular season with  double digit wins over rivals LSU and Mississippi State and were ranked #12 coming into the game, which was their second consecutive New Year's Six bowl game.

Game summary

Scoring summary

 

Source:

Statistics

References

2015–16 NCAA football bowl games
2016
2016
2016
2016 in sports in Louisiana
21st century in New Orleans
January 2016 sports events in the United States